Moon Jong-up (born February 6, 1995), also known mononymously as Jongup, is a South Korean singer, dancer, and actor. He debuted as an idol in the six-member group B.A.P under TS Entertainment, where he served as a sub-vocalist from 2012 to its dissolution in 2019. Following his departure from TS Entertainment, he released his debut single album Headache in May 2020.

Early life
Moon was born on February 6, 1995, in Siheung, Gyeonggi Province. He is the youngest of three sons. He initially enrolled into an elementary school in the city before transferring to Sunae Elementary School in Bundang-gu, Seongnam, a month later. His mother, a certified chef, opened up a business at the time. Moon also attended Sunae Middle School, where he joined the dance club and performed at various school festivals and b-boy tournaments by the end of his first year. He was admitted into Hanlim Multi Art School in the Songpa District of Seoul and graduated on February 7, 2013.

Career

Career beginnings and B.A.P

Moon met a talent agent during a competition, who would later call him for an audition. He danced to an Usher song and received his notice of acceptance on his way home. He became a trainee under TS Entertainment in August during his first year in high school. He spent the longest time as a trainee after bandmate Yongguk.

Moon was revealed as a member of idol sextet B.A.P on January 17, 2012, where he served as a sub-vocalist and main dancer. The group debuted nine days later with their single album Warrior. In November 2014, B.A.P filed a lawsuit against its agency. The members sought to nullify its contract with the company citing "unfair conditions and profit distribution". In August of the following year, the two parties ultimately settled and B.A.P resumed its activities under TS Entertainment. In August and December 2018, Yongguk and Zelo left the group and record label following the expiration of their contracts, respectively. Moon and the remaining three members left the agency in February 2019, leading the dissolution of B.A.P.

As a soloist
Moon performed his first solo song entitled "Try My Luck" during B.A.P's 2017 World Tour 'Party Baby!' in March. A PBR&B track, it was released as part of a project album with fellow member Daehyun on June 8. Following B.A.P's disbandment, Moon took a six-month break from music. He was cast for an encore show of the theater production The Lost Village; the performance took place on April 27, 2019. Set in Jeju Island amid the historical events of 1979, he played the young version of bar owner Donghyuk. Moon was a contestant on Maeil Broadcasting Network's survival reality show Signhere (2019), where participants auditioned to join Jay Park's record label AOMG. He passed the first round, but was eliminated in the second after his collaborative performance with MBA. In November, Moon signed an exclusive contract with The Groove Company. He released his debut single album Headache and its funk-pop title track on May 7, 2020.  He released his first extended play Us on July 8, 2021. He will be playing the role of Jang Jun in the upcoming music comedy Idol Recipe (2021), a film about an idol group that finds success despite being abandoned by their agency.

On May 31, Moon announced that RE:MEET fan meetings will be held in Japan on July 30 and 31, 2022.

Musical style
Moon cites American musician Chris Brown as his role model, who influenced him to become a singer.

Discography

Albums

Extended plays

Single albums

Singles

Guest appearances

Soundtrack appearances

Filmography

References

External links
 

1995 births
21st-century South Korean male actors
21st-century South Korean singers
B.A.P (South Korean band) members
Hanlim Multi Art School alumni
Japanese-language singers of South Korea
K-pop singers
Living people
People from Seongnam
South Korean child singers
South Korean male dancers
South Korean male film actors
South Korean male idols
South Korean male singers
South Korean male stage actors
TS Entertainment artists